is a Japanese manga series written and illustrated by Sekihiko Inui. An anime OVA series based on the manga was later produced by Marvelous Entertainment and animated by Bee Train. The anime had been licensed by ADV Films, but was transferred to Funimation in 2008.

Plot
The story begins with Dr. Akamashi, introduced as a scientist formerly in the employ of the government, launching a coup d'état in the Forland Kingdom. Dying, the mortally wounded king sends his daughter Alita to find Prince Kaito, who is leading a diplomatic mission and its military escort abroad. She flees from the castle and reaches a forest on the country's border.

While running, the princess falls off of a cliff and onto Falis, an infamous female bounty hunter. Due to the nature of the near-death experience (referred to as a spiritual commutation, or spiritual transmigration in the anime dub) the souls of Alita and Falis are switched. After Falis dispatches the forest's guardian beast, Alita pleads with the bounty hunter to protect the Forland kingdom, offering herself, body and soul, as collateral. Falis agrees and acts as the princess of the Forland Kingdom with her bounty hunter friends.

Characters

Heroes
 aka 

Second child of the late King Forland. She escapes from the castle during Akamashi's coup, running into Falis and switching bodies with her due to a near-death experience. In return for helping with the defense of the kingdom, she offers the bounty hunter her body and soul. She later assumes the identity of her former maid Milano, who died ensuring her safe escape during the coup, and assists Falis with running the kingdom. Alita was very wavering at first, not given the time to grieve her father and her friend Milano's death, and she is forced to protect her kingdom until her brother, Kaito, arrives. But as the series progress, Alita becomes more strong-willed and bold, especially when it comes to Falis's safety. This is demonstrated when she learns the truth of Kaito's treachery, she protects an injured Falis by luring him into thinking she was Alita so Falis could be safe. Alita angrily declares Kaito a disgrace to their royal bloodline at that moment. After this Falis and Alita become closer and more protective of each other for the remainder of the series.

 aka 

Falis is one of the strongest and the most infamous bounty hunters in the world, even attributed with having slain a dragon. When operating near the border of Forland Kingdom, Princess Alita runs into her, and the two of them end up switching bodies by accident. Now stuck in Alita's body, she makes a deal with Alita to assume her identity and defend her kingdom. Falis' weapon of choice is the ancient katana ; she sometimes uses a dagger in conjunction with the sword. Experiencing hardships in the past, Falis is tough, resilient, and impulsive but she is shown to have a more thoughtful and empathetic side that is perhaps rarely seen. In the beginning of the series, Falis thought Alita was a frail and weak-minded princess who couldn't do much on her own. But that thought changed throughout the series after seeing Alita's strong-will and courage, prompting Falis to keep her promise as the princess of Forland Kingdom. Falis has a strong relationship with Alita, she remained loyal even after finding out the truth of Alita's family secrets and is very protective of her, not hesitating to strike down any opponents who threaten Alita.

A fellow bounty hunter working for Falis. In the manga he is a Shinigami with extensive knowledge, while in the anime he is a cyborg. His weapon of choice is a large scythe.

Fellow bounty hunter working for Falis. While he is big, ferocious, and overpowering in hand to hand combat, beneath his purple skin is a gentle soul. Like Dominikov, Pete is a cyborg in the anime version.

Butler of Forland Kingdom's royal family. He has a very serious personality and is strict when he is training Alita in the ways of a princess. He continues to serve in this capacity after Alita and Falis switch bodies, in order to aid Falis in acting out her part.

The real Milano, Alita's maid and granddaughter of Jodo. She disguises herself as Princess Alita to buy Alita time to escape from Akamashi's coup d'état, but is killed while carrying out that role. Alita later assumes Milano's identity.

Villains

Formerly a scientist working for the late King Forland. He has abused lost technology entrusted to the Forland royal family, and conspires to take over the kingdom in order to gain complete possession over said technology. It is later revealed that Cecilia informed him of the lost technology which corrupted him. He seeks to capture Alita alive. Akamashi is an expert in creating artificial lifeforms, be they of flesh and blood or of metal. However he is later killed by Kaito after discovering Teoria's location.

One of Dr. Akamashi's robotic bodyguards. Ana is built in the shape of a little girl with technology originating in "the Old World". She is extremely aggressive and likes to taunt her opponents, with no regard for human lives except Akamashi's. Her ability and equipment are specialized for close quarter combat.

One of Dr. Akamashi's robotic bodyguards, built in the same manner as Ana. Contrary to Ana, however, she is timid and shy, albeit with a tendency of going berserk and letting loose her firepower upon everyone in sight if Akamashi is in grave danger. Her use of technology from "the Old World" is more obvious, including an array of precision, long-range weapons such as guns and missiles.

A powerful sorceress who is tracking Alita's every move. Not much about her is known except that she is a relic from the old world, supposedly also a cyborg as stated by Diminikov during their battle. She is the hand acting behind the scenes, manipulating both Prince Kaito and Dr. Akamashi into seeking Teoria. She is also responsible for wiping out Falis' village in a 'test' of her own strength and is ultimately killed when Falis destroys the jewel below her neck.

Prince Kaito aka 

Prince of Forland, Kaito is Alita's older brother and eight years her senior. She speaks of him fondly, bragging of his swordsmanship as well as his kindness. Prince Kaito left the country to hold peace talks with Forland's western neighbor, the kingdom of Grandel, but no one has heard from him since. When he comes back, it is revealed that he is the man clad in a heavy, dark-colored set of armor that accompanies Cecilia. He is shown to be quite skilled at swordsmanship. He wishes to use Teoria to destroy the world due to humanity's constant wars.

Anime
A six-episode original video animation (OVA) series was produced in 2007 by Marvelous Entertainment and animated by Bee Train. It was the first Bee Train production since 1999 to not be directed by company founder, CEO and chief staff director Koichi Mashimo. Mashimo was on board as a planning staff member. The video series was scripted by Tatsuhiko Urahata. Bee Train staff director Tomoyuki Kurokawa was placed as the Chief Director and directed the animators and other directors Shin'ya Kawatsura and Tomoaki Kado.

Production AI Art directors Yoshimi Umino and Shin Watanabe were the principal art directors for the videos and Yoshimitsu Yamashita was the character designer and music was composed by Yasufumi Fukuda. The opening theme is  FK Metal ver., performed by BACK-ON, while the ending theme is "Naked Flower", performed by Romi Park.

Reception

In Jason Thompson's appendix to Manga: The Complete Guide,  he praised the "stylized, cute artwork", calling it "the best feature of this short and tame action-adventure comic."

References

External links
 
Murder Princess at FUNimation

 via FUNimation

2005 manga
2007 anime OVAs
ADV Films
ASCII Media Works manga
Action anime and manga
Bee Train Production
Comedy anime and manga
Dark fantasy anime and manga
Dengeki Comics
Fiction about body swapping
Funimation
Kadokawa Dwango franchises
Marvelous Entertainment
Seinen manga